Plains Independent School District is a public school district based in Plains, Texas, United States.

The district has three campuses -

Plains High School (Grades 9-12)
Plains Middle School (Grades 5-8)
Plains Elementary School (Grades PK-4)

In 2009, the school district was rated "recognized" by the Texas Education Agency.

References

External links
Plains ISD

School districts in Yoakum County, Texas